An All-American team is an honorary sports team composed of the best amateur players of a specific season for each team position—who in turn are given the honorific "All-America" and typically referred to as "All-American athletes", or simply "All-Americans". Although the honorees generally do not compete together as a unit, the term is used in U.S. team sports to refer to players who are selected by members of the national media.  Walter Camp selected the first All-America team in the early days of American football in 1889.  The 2021 NCAA Men's Basketball All-Americans are honorary lists that include All-American selections from the Associated Press (AP), the United States Basketball Writers Association (USBWA), Sporting News (SN), and the National Association of Basketball Coaches (NABC) for the 2020–21 NCAA Division I men's basketball season. All selectors choose three teams, while AP also lists honorable mention selections.

The Consensus 2021 College Basketball All-American team will be determined by aggregating the results of the four major All-American teams as determined by the National Collegiate Athletic Association (NCAA). Since United Press International was replaced by TSN in 1997, the four major selectors have been the aforementioned ones. AP has been a selector since 1948, NABC since 1957 and USBWA since 1960.  To earn "consensus" status, a player must win honors based on a point system computed from the four different all-America teams. The point system consists of three points for first team, two points for second team and one point for third team. No honorable mention or fourth team or lower are used in the computation. The top five totals plus ties are first team and the next five plus ties are second team.

Although the aforementioned lists are used to determine consensus honors, there are numerous other All-American lists. The ten finalists for the John Wooden Award are described as Wooden All-Americans. The ten finalists for the Senior CLASS Award are described as Senior All-Americans.  Other All-American lists include those determined by USA Today, Fox Sports, Yahoo! Sports and many others. The scholar-athletes selected by College Sports Information Directors of America (CoSIDA) are termed Academic All-Americans.

2021 Consensus All-America team

PG – Point guard
SG – Shooting guard
PF – Power forward
SF – Small forward
C – Center

Individual All-America teams

By player

By team

AP Honorable Mention:

 Max Abmas, Oral Roberts
 Joël Ayayi, Gonzaga
 Alex Barcello, BYU
 Scottie Barnes, Florida State
 Charles Bassey, Western Kentucky
 James Bouknight, UConn
 Justin Champagnie, Pittsburgh
 Derek Culver, West Virginia
 Antoine Davis, Detroit Mercy
 Kendric Davis, SMU
 David Duke, Providence
 Collin Gillespie, Villanova
 RaiQuan Gray, Florida State
 Sam Hauser, Virginia
 Jay Huff, Virginia
 Nah'Shon Hyland, VCU
 Trayce Jackson-Davis, Indiana
 Andrew Jones, Texas
 Carlik Jones, Louisville
 E. J. Liddell, Ohio State
 Isaiah Livers, Michigan
 Sandro Mamukelashvili, Seton Hall
 JaQuori McLaughlin, UC Santa Barbara
 Tre Mann, Florida
 Remy Martin, Arizona State
 Miles McBride, West Virginia
 Mac McClung, Texas Tech
 Matt Mitchell, San Diego State
 Moses Moody, Arkansas
 Scotty Pippen Jr., Vanderbilt
 Neemias Queta, Utah State
 Austin Reaves, Oklahoma
 Jeremiah Robinson-Earl, Villanova
 Jaden Shackelford, Alabama
 Terry Taylor, Austin Peay
 MaCio Teague, Baylor
 Cameron Thomas, LSU
 Franz Wagner, Michigan
 Trevion Williams, Purdue
 McKinley Wright IV, Colorado
 Moses Wright, Georgia Tech
 Marcus Zegarowski, Creighton

Academic All-Americans
The College Sports Information Directors of America (CoSIDA) announced its 15-member 2021 Academic All-America team on May 28, 2021, divided into first, second and third teams, with Corey Kispert of Gonzaga chosen as men's college basketball Academic All-American of the Year.

Senior All-Americans
The 10 finalists for the Senior CLASS Award, called Senior All-Americans, were announced on February 22, 2021. Luka Garza of Iowa was named the recipient on April 2, with the first and second teams also being announced at that time.

First team

Second team

References

All-Americans
NCAA Men's Basketball All-Americans